Codename: Ego Stripper is the fifth studio album by American hip hop duo Ces Cru. The album was released on August 5, 2014, by Strange Music. The album debuted at number 40 on the Billboard 200 chart.

Critical reception

Upon its release, Codename: Ego Stripper was met with generally positive reviews. David Jeffries of AllMusic said, "Still a force to be reckoned with, Ces Cru's sophomore effort for Tech N9ne's Strange Music label retains the energy and intensity of their debut while walking the pimp walk with a more comfortable, sure strut." Kellan Miller of HipHopDX said, "Ces Cru is still a band with a witty-lyrics heavy approach, but overall Codename: Ego Stripper excels at putting the entire package together; a glaring problem with their last release. Ushering in a lengthy track list for an audience easily enticed by instagram, vines, (is-that-a-baby-smoking-a cigarette?) attention spans shows that Ces feel that they deserve their massive viral hype. On that note, "Hope" features the duo waxing poetic over a jazzy instrumental about exactly how far they envision their careers will soar. It is a fitting nightcap to an impressive release."

Commercial performance
The album debuted at number 40 on the Billboard 200 chart, with first-week sales of 6,354 copies in the United States.

Track listing

 Notes
 Track listing and credits from album booklet.
 "Whips" features additional vocals by Seven and Kerry Rounds.
 "Pressure" features additional vocals by Crystal Clayton and guitar by Tyler Lyon.
 "Double OT" features additional vocals by Crystal Clayton.
 "Phineas Gage" and "Strange Creature" feature scratches by DJ Sku.
 "Hope" features bass guitar by Chris Handley.
 "Axiom" features additional vocals by Adrian Truth and piano by Mark Lowrey.

Personnel
Credits for Codename: Ego Stripper adapted from the album liner notes.

 Richie Abbott – publicity
 Angel Davanport – featured artist
 Tom Baker – mastering
 Aaron Bean – marketing & promotions, street marketing
 Bernz – featured artist
 Brent Bradley – internet marketing
 Violet Brown – production assistant
 Valdora Case – production assistant
 Jared Coop – merchandising
 Glenda Cowan – production assistant
 Godemis – primary artist
 Ben Cybulsky – mixing, producer
 Penny Ervin – merchandising
 Braxton Flemming – merchandising
 Ben Grossi – project consultant, general management
 Mary Harris – merchandising
 Info Gates – producer
 Leonard Dstroy – producer
 Robert Lieberman – legal
 Ryan Lindberg – internet marketing
 Liquid 9 – art direction & design
 Korey Lloyd – production assistant, project management
 James Meierotto – photography
 Murs – featured artist
 Jeff Nelson – internet marketing
 Cory Nielsen – production assistant
 Dawn O'Guin – production assistant
 Travis O'Guin – executive producer, A&R
 Rob Prior – art direction & design
 Jose Ramirez – street marketing
 Mark Reifsteck – booking
 Rittz – featured artist
 Victor Sandoval – internet marketing
 Brian Shafton – project consultant, general management
 Michael "Seven" Summers – producer
 Tech N9ne – featured artist
 Ubiquitous – primary artist
 Dave Weiner – A&R, associate producer
 Wrekonize – featured artist

Charts

References

2014 albums
Strange Music albums